Jordan Parsons (August 26, 1990 – May 4, 2016) was an American mixed martial artist who formerly competed in Bellator's featherweight division. A professional competitor since 2010, Parsons had also previously competed for the Championship Fighting Alliance.

Mixed martial arts career

Early career
Parsons turned professional in October 2010 after amassing a 3–0 record as an amateur. He went undefeated in his first four bouts before signing with the Championship Fighting Alliance.

Championship Fighting Alliance
Parsons made his CFA debut against James Polodna at CFA 3: Howard vs. Olson on October 9, 2011. He won the fight via unanimous decision.

Parsons next faced James Cianci at CFA 4: Izquierdo vs. Cenoble on December 17, 2011, in the semifinal round of the promotions undefeated featherweight tournament. He won the fight via unanimous decision to secure his place in the finals.

Parsons faced off against Danny Chavez in the finals, which took place at CFA 5: Chavez vs. Parsons on February 24, 2012, for the featherweight title. He won the fight via unanimous decision after five rounds to become the new CFA Featherweight Champion.

In his first defense, Parsons faced Lazar Stojadinovic at CFA 7: Never Give Up on June 30, 2012, and lost via knockout in the first round, the first loss of his career.

Driller Promotions
Following a year layoff, Parsons moved to the lightweight division and defeated Derek Getzel via unanimous decision at Driller Promotions / SEG: Havoc at High Five 2 on June 29, 2013.

Parsons fought and defeated Damien Hill via first-round submission to become the Driller Promotions Lightweight Champion on September 14, 2013, at Driller Promotions / SEG: Caged Chaos at Canterbury Park 4.

Bellator MMA
Parsons made his Bellator debut against Tim Bazer on April 18, 2014, at Bellator 117. He won the fight via knockout, just four seconds into the second round. During the bout, Parsons tore his meniscus, which sidelined him until 2015.

After signing a six-fight deal with the promotion, Parsons returned to featherweight and faced fellow prospect Julio Cesar, who was undefeated with a record of 30–0, at Bellator 137 on May 15, 2015. Parsons defeated Cesar via submission due to an arm-triangle choke in the third round, handing the Brazilian his first loss.

Parsons then faced Bubba Jenkins at Bellator 146 on November 20, 2015. After surviving a head kick that wobbled and knocked him down, he lost the fight via split decision.

Parsons was scheduled to face Adam Piccolotti at Bellator 154 on May 14, 2016. However, Parsons died as a result of a hit-and-run incident that occurred on May 1.

Personal life

Jordan Parsons was born on August 26, 1990, in Fargo, North Dakota. His family then moved to the poverty-stricken town of Covert, Michigan when he was 8 years old. Living in Covert, Parsons was exposed to violence at a very young age with one of his classmates being a victim of sexual assault. It was then that Parsons realized he needed to learn to defend himself. Parsons was an over-weight child with a father that had a rare skin condition- both elements that made him a target for being bullied on a regular basis.

Jordan's parents separated when Jordan was just 13 years old, and his mother moved him to Berrien Springs, Michigan. It was here that Parsons began to take an interest in working out and wrestling, qualifying for the state tournament twice for Berrien Springs High. At the age of 15, Parsons broke out of his shell when a group of older kids cornered him and a friend at the beach. Parsons was forced to defend himself against the odds and quickly learned that he was able to do so very well, coming out of the altercation unscathed.

Jordan's first fight in a ring was when he was only 17 years old, after training at a local MMA gym for just a month. After winning the fight quickly, he developed a passion for the sport. Parsons had found his calling, resulting in progressively moving up the ranks. It began with traveling across the country to eventually win the belt in the CFA. Later in his career, Parsons trained with some of the best fighters and coaches in the world. This led Jordan to signing with Bellator. He trained at Jaco Hybrid with The Blackzilians, one of the world's most elite group of MMA athletes

Death 

Parsons was hit by a Range Rover in Delray Beach, Florida early in the morning of May 1, 2016, while crossing a street. As a result, he had the bottom half of his right leg  amputated. He died on May 4, 2016, as a result of his injuries. On May 7, 28-year-old Dennis Wright of Boca Raton was charged with leaving the scene of a crash causing death, tampering with evidence and driving with a suspended license as a habitual offender, his sixth suspension. Wright tried to take the damaged SUV to a body shop, but the body shop owner refused to repair the SUV. According to the unnamed witnesses cited in the report, the body shop owner knew the SUV had been involved in the crash that killed Jordan Parsons. That led to Wright storing the SUV at Security Storage Facility at 189 W. Linton Blvd, police said.

In October 2016, it was announced that a postmortem analysis of Parsons' brain had revealed the degenerative brain disease Chronic traumatic encephalopathy (CTE). Parsons was the second fighter in the multibillion-dollar MMA industry to be publicly identified as having been diagnosed with CTE, with Gary Goodridge being the first.

Championships and accomplishments

Mixed martial arts
Championship Fighting Alliance
CFA Featherweight Championship (one time)
CFA featherweight tournament winner
Driller Promotions
Driller Promotions Lightweight Championship (one time)

Mixed martial arts record

|-
|Loss
|align=center|11–2
|Bubba Jenkins
|Decision (split)
|Bellator 146
|
|align=center|3
|align=center|5:00
|Thackerville, Oklahoma, United States
|
|-
|Win
|align=center|11–1
|Julio Cesar
|Submission (arm-triangle choke)
|Bellator 137
|
|align=center|3
|align=center|4:09
|Temecula, California, United States
|
|-
|Win
|align=center|10–1
|Tim Bazer
|KO (punches)
|Bellator 117
|
|align=center|2
|align=center|0:04
|Council Bluffs, Iowa, United States
|
|-
|Win
|align=center|9–1
|Damien Hill
|Submission (guillotine choke)
|Driller Promotions / SEG: Caged Chaos at Canterbury Park 4
|
|align=center|1
|align=center|1:10
|Shakopee, Minnesota, United States
|
|-
|Win
|align=center|8–1
|Derek Getzel
|Decision (unanimous)
|Driller Promotions / SEG: Havoc at High Five 2
|
|align=center|3
|align=center|5:00
|Burnsville, Minnesota, United States
|
|-
|Loss
|align=center|7–1
|Lazar Stojadinovic
|KO (punch)
|CFA 7: Never Give Up
|
|align=center|1
|align=center|1:11
|Coral Gables, Florida, United States
|
|-
|Win
|align=center|7–0
|Danny Chavez
|Decision (unanimous)
|CFA 5: Chavez vs. Parsons
|
|align=center|5
|align=center|5:00
|Coral Gables, Florida, United States
|
|-
|Win
|align=center|6–0
|James Cianci
|Decision (unanimous)
|CFA 4: Izquierdo vs. Cenoble
|
|align=center|3
|align=center|5:00
|Coral Gables, Florida, United States
|
|-
|Win
|align=center|5–0
|James Polodna
|Decision (unanimous)
|CFA 3: Howard vs. Olson
|
|align=center|3
|align=center|5:00
|Miami, Florida, United States
|
|-
|Win
|align=center|4–0
|Bobby Ferrier
|Submission (guillotine choke)
|EB: Beatdown at 4 Bears 9
|
|align=center|1
|align=center|1:39
|New Town, North Dakota, United States
|
|-
|Win
|align=center|3–0
|Robert Couillard
|Decision (unanimous)
|Combat USA: Country USA 1
|
|align=center|3
|align=center|5:00
|Oshkosh, Wisconsin, United States
|
|-
|Win
|align=center|2–0
|Bruce Reis
|TKO (punches)
|EB: Beatdown at 4 Bears 7
|
|align=center|1
|align=center|2:34
|New Town, North Dakota, United States
|
|-
|Win
|align=center|1–0
|Derek Abram
|TKO (punches)
|Impact Fighting Championship: Inception
|
|align=center|1
|align=center|2:59
|Bismarck, North Dakota, United States
|

References

1990 births
2016 deaths
American male mixed martial artists
Road incident deaths in Florida
Sportspeople from Fargo, North Dakota
Pedestrian road incident deaths
People with traumatic brain injuries
People from Berrien Springs, Michigan
Sportspeople with chronic traumatic encephalopathy